Quioveo is the extinct volcanic peak at the centre of the island of Annobón, Equatorial Guinea. It rises to a height of 598 metres. 

The island of Annobón is part of the Cameroon line of volcanoes, together with the islands of São Tomé Island, Príncipe, Bioko, and Mount Cameroon on the African mainland.

References

Volcanoes of Equatorial Guinea
Annobón